A quatrefoil (four leaf) is a decorative element of four partially overlapping circles.

Quatrefoil may also refer to:

 Quatrefoil: A Modern Novel, a 1950 book by James Barr
 Quatrefoil Library, in Minneapolis, Minnesota, U.S.
 Quatrefoil reentry, a type of cardiac arrhythmia

See also 
 Foil (architecture)
 Trefoil (disambiguation) (three leaf)
 Cinquefoil (disambiguation) (five leaf)
 Four-leaf clover